The 1960 U.S. National Championships (now known as the US Open) was a tennis tournament that took place on outdoor grass courts at two locations in the United States. The men's and women's singles as well as the mixed doubles were played from September 2 through September 17 at the West Side Tennis Club, Forest Hills in New York City, while the men's and women's doubles were held at the Longwood Cricket Club in Chestnut Hill, Massachusetts from August 21 through August 28, 1960. It was the 80th staging of the U.S. National Championships, and the fourth Grand Slam tennis event of 1960. Neale Fraser and Darlene Hard won the singles titles.

Finals

Men's singles

 Neale Fraser defeated  Rod Laver  6–4, 6–4, 9–7

Women's singles

 Darlene Hard defeated  Maria Bueno  6–4, 10–12, 6–4

Men's doubles
 Neale Fraser /  Roy Emerson defeated  Rod Laver /  Bob Mark 9–7, 6–2, 6–4

Women's doubles
 Maria Bueno /  Darlene Hard defeated  Ann Haydon /  Deidre Catt 6–1, 6–1

Mixed doubles
 Margaret Osborne duPont /   Neale Fraser defeated  Maria Bueno /  Antonio Palafox 6–3, 6–2

Notes

References

External links
Official US Open website

 
U.S. National Championships|U.S. National Championships (tennis)
U.S. National Championships (tennis) by year
U.S. National Championships (tennis)
U.S. National Championships (tennis)
U.S. National Championships (tennis)
U.S. National Championships (tennis)
1960s in Boston
Chestnut Hill, Massachusetts
Tennis in Massachusetts